Elateia or Elatia was a town in Pelasgiotis in ancient Thessaly, described by Livy, along with Gonnus, as situated in the pass leading to the Vale of Tempe. Elateia is called Iletia by Pliny the Elder, and Iletium or Iletion (Ἰλέτιον) by Ptolemy. It is mentioned by Stephanus of Byzantium under its right name.

Its site in unlocated.

References

Populated places in ancient Thessaly
Former populated places in Greece
Lost ancient cities and towns
Pelasgiotis